Kensey McMahon is an American competition swimmer who specializes in freestyle events.

Amateur career 
She previously completed for Mandarin High School and the Alabama Crimson Tide.

Open water career 
McMahon finished 10th at the 2022 World Aquatics Championships Women's 25 km Open Water.

Pool career 
She was a bronze medalist in the Women's 1500 metre freestyle at the 2022 FINA World Swimming Championships (25 m).

References

Living people
American female freestyle swimmers
Medalists at the FINA World Swimming Championships (25 m)
Year of birth missing (living people)
Alabama Crimson Tide women's swimmers